The Battle of Odžak was the last battle of World War II in Europe. The battle began on 19 April 1945 and lasted until 25 May 1945, 17 days after the end of the war in Europe. The combatants were the Armed Forces of the Independent State of Croatia (NDH) commanded by Petar Rajković and the Yugoslav Army commanded by Miloš Zekić. The battle took place in the Bosnian town of Odžak. The battle was a victory for the Partisans.

The battle is thoroughly described in a number of books, for example, in a 1969 book on 53rd Division, 1981 book on 16th Muslim Brigade, 1983 book on 27th East Bosnian Division, and 1983 book on 14th Central Bosnian Brigade.

References

Bibliography
 
 
 
 
 
 

Yugoslavia in World War II
Battles involving the Independent State of Croatia
Battles involving the Yugoslav Partisans
Conflicts in 1945
Bosnia and Herzegovina in World War II
April 1945 events
May 1945 events